"One Last Song" is a song by English singer Sam Smith. It was written by Smith, Tyler Johnson and Charles Emanuel Smalls, with production handled by Steve Fitzmaurice, Jimmy Napes and Johnson. The song was released on 3 November 2017 through Capitol Records, as the second single from Smith's 2017 studio album, The Thrill of It All.

Commercial performance
On 10 November 2017, "One Last Song" debuted on the UK Singles Chart at number twenty-seven, selling 13,851 copies. It also debuted at number thirty-six in Ireland.

Live performances
Smith performed "One Last Song" live during their intimate shows in Los Angeles, New York, London and Berlin in mid-September 2017. On 8 November 2017, they performed it on the Today show in the United States. The singer performed the single at The X Factor UK season 14 finale, on 3 December 2017.

Charts

Weekly charts

Year-end charts

Certifications

Release history

References

Sam Smith (singer) songs
2017 songs
2017 singles
Capitol Records singles
Songs written by Sam Smith (singer)
Songs written by Tyler Johnson (musician)
Songs written by Charlie Smalls